is a Japanese professional golfer who plays on the Japan Golf Tour and the Asian Tour.

Iwata was born in Sendai, Miyagi Prefecture, Japan. He started playing golf at the age of 14, by his father's influence, who ran a local golf range and was a professional golfer on the Japan Senior Tour. Iwata played college golf at Tohoku Fukushi University.

Iwata turned professional in 2004 and has played on the Japan Golf Tour since then. His first win came at the 2014 Fujisankei Classic. He also won the 2015 Shigeo Nagashima Invitational Sega Sammy Cup. In the second round of the 2015 PGA Championship at Whistling Straits, Iwata shot a 63, which matched the then lowest round in a major championship. Iwata played on the 2016 PGA Tour, having qualified through the 2015 Web.com Tour Finals, finishing 24th in the priority ranking.

Professional wins (4)

Japan Golf Tour wins (4)

*Note: The 2021 Crowns was shortened to 54 holes due to weather.

Japan Golf Tour playoff record (0–2)

Results in major championships

CUT = missed the half-way cut
"T" indicates a tie for a place

Results in World Golf Championships
Results not in chronological order before 2015.

"T" = tied

See also
2015 Web.com Tour Finals graduates

References

External links

Japanese male golfers
Japan Golf Tour golfers
PGA Tour golfers
Korn Ferry Tour graduates
Sportspeople from Sendai
1981 births
Living people